The Corn Exchange in Ipswich, Suffolk is a municipal building belonging to Ipswich Borough Council. It was opened on 26 July 1882 by Frederick Fish, the Mayor of Ipswich.

References

Buildings and structures in Ipswich